Henry Allen Bullock (May 2, 1906 - February 8, 1973) was an American historian and sociologist and the first Black professor to be appointed to the faculty of arts and sciences at the University of Texas at Austin.

Education
He graduated from Virginia Union University with a B.A in social sciences and Latin classics in 1928, from the University of Michigan with an M.A. in sociology and comparative psychology in 1929 and with a Ph.D. in sociology in 1942. He was an Earhardt Foundation fellow at the University of Michigan.

Career 
He taught at North Carolina Agricultural and Technical State University in 1929-30, at Prairie View A&M, from 1930 to 1949, at Dillard University from 1949–50, at Texas Southern University from 1950 to 1969. He became the first African American to serve on the faculty of arts and sciences at the University of Texas at Austin, where he served from 1969 to 1971.

He retired in 1971 to his home in Houston, Texas.

Awards
In 1968, Bullock won the Bancroft Prize from Columbia University for his work, A History of Negro Education in the South.

Works
 Urban Homicide in Theory and Fact
 A History of Negro Education in the South
A Comparison of the Academic Achievements of White and Negro High School Graduates
Significance of the Racial Factor in the Length of Prison Sentences
Racial Attitudes and the Employment of Negroes
The Black College and the New Black Awareness
The Prediction of Dropout Behavior Among Urban Negro Boys

References

Virginia Union University alumni
University of Michigan alumni
1906 births
1973 deaths
American sociologists
Historians of the Southern United States
History of the Thirteen Colonies
20th-century American historians
20th-century American male writers
Bancroft Prize winners
American male non-fiction writers